The 1893 World Allround Speed Skating Championships took place at 13 and 14 January at the ice rink Museumplein in Amsterdam, the Netherlands. It is the fourth World Allround Speed Skating Championships organised at the Museumplein in Amsterdam. (The championships in 1892 were canceled due to thaw). It was the first official World Allround Speed Skating Championship after the foundation of the International Skating Union (ISU) in 1892. The Dutch skater Jaap Eden became the first official ISU-World allround by winning the 1500, 5000 en 500 meter. He did not need to finish the 10000m according to the rules. Oskar Fredriksen from Norway skated the championship the first World record at the 10000 meter.

Allround results 

  * = Fell
 NC = Not classified
 NF = Not finished
 NS = Not started
 DQ = Disqualified
Source: SpeedSkatingStats.com

Rules 
Four distances had to be skated: 500, 1500, 5000 and 10,000 m. One could earn the world title only by winning at least three of the four distances, otherwise the title would be vacant. The winner of the 500 and 1500 meter was decided by a skate off of the best four skaters of the distance. Silver and bronze medals were not awarded.

References 

World Allround Speed Skating Championships, 1893
1893 World Allround
World Allround, 1893
World Allround Speed Skating Championships, 1893
1893 in the Netherlands
January 1893 sports events
19th century in Amsterdam
1893 in Dutch sport